XHMN-FM is a radio station on 107.7 FM in Monterrey, Nuevo León. The station is owned by Grupo Imagen and carries its talk format.

History
XHMN began with a concession issued on April 16, 1977, to Ernesto Hinojosa Subeldía, originally the station known as "Stereo Siete". In 2001, the station was sold to Imagen.

References

Radio stations in Monterrey
Grupo Imagen
Radio stations established in 1977
1977 establishments in Mexico